Paolo Martinelli (born 29 September 1952 in Modena, Italy) is an engineer best known for his position as head of Scuderia Ferrari's Engine Department from 1994 to 2006.

Career

Martinelli studied mechanical engineering at Bologna University, graduating in 1978.  He joined Ferrari immediately, at first working on engine design for the company's production cars.

In 1994 he was appointed head of the Formula One team's Engine Department, where he took the decision to ditch the commitment to running V12 engines in favour of V10s.  The first V10-powered Ferrari raced in 1996, and the team used this configuration to win five Drivers' and six Constructors' Championships before rules were brought in stipulating the use of V8s for 2006. Martinelli's favorite race was the 2000 Japanese Grand Prix at Suzuka which Michael Schumacher won in a Ferrari.

In October 2006, Martinelli moved to an executive role within Fiat, Ferrari's parent company.  His position in Ferrari was taken over by Gilles Simon.

References

Grandprix.com biography, retrieved 27 October 2006.

1952 births
Living people
University of Bologna alumni
Ferrari people
Formula One engine engineers
Italian motorsport people